Mežāre parish is an administrative unit of Jēkabpils Municipality in the Latgale region of Latvia.

Towns, villages and settlements of Mežāre parish 
  – parish administrative center

References 

Parishes of Latvia
Jēkabpils Municipality
Latgale